Lapis lazuli, or lapis for short, is a deep-blue metamorphic rock used as a semi-precious stone that has been prized since antiquity for its intense color. As early as the 7th millennium BC, lapis lazuli was mined in the Sar-i Sang mines, in Shortugai, and in other mines in Badakhshan province in nowadays northeast Afghanistan. Lapis lazuli artifacts, dated to 7570 BC, have been found at Bhirrana, which is the oldest site of Indus Valley civilisation. Lapis was highly valued by the Indus Valley Civilisation (7570–1900 BC). Lapis beads have been found at Neolithic burials in Mehrgarh, the Caucasus, and as far away as Mauritania. It was used in the funeral mask of Tutankhamun (1341–1323 BC).

By the end of the Middle Ages, lapis lazuli began to be exported to Europe, where it was ground into powder and made into ultramarine, the finest and most expensive of all blue pigments. Ultramarine was used by some of the most important artists of the Renaissance and Baroque, including Masaccio, Perugino, Titian and Vermeer, and was often reserved for the clothing of the central figures of their paintings, especially the Virgin Mary. Ultramarine has also been found in dental tartar of medieval nuns and scribes.

Major sources
Mines in northeast Afghanistan continue to be a major source of lapis lazuli. Important amounts are also produced from mines west of Lake Baikal in Russia,  and in the Andes mountains in Peru which is the source that the Inca used to carve artifacts and jewelry. Smaller quantities are mined in Pakistan, Italy, Mongolia, the United States, and Canada.

Etymology
It means "sky" or "heaven"; so this is a "stone (of/from) the sky" or "stone (of/from) heaven". Historically, it was mined in the  Badakhshan region of upper Afghanistan.  is etymologically related to the color blue, and used as a root for the word for blue in several languages, including Spanish and Portuguese .

Science and uses

Composition
The most important mineral component of lapis lazuli is lazurite (25% to 40%), a blue feldspathoid silicate mineral with the formula . Most lapis lazuli also contains calcite (white), sodalite (blue), and pyrite (metallic yellow). Some samples of lapis lazuli contain augite, diopside, enstatite, mica, hauynite, hornblende, nosean, and sulfur-rich löllingite geyerite.

Lapis lazuli usually occurs in crystalline marble as a result of contact metamorphism.

Color

The intense blue color is due to the presence of the trisulfur radical anion in the crystal. The presence of disulfur  and tetrasulfur radicals can shift the color towards yellow or red, respectively. These radical anions substitute for the chloride anions within the sodalite structure. The  radical anion exhibits a visible absorption band in the range 595–620 nm with high molar absorptivity, leading to its bright blue color.

Sources
Lapis lazuli is found in limestone in the Kokcha River valley of Badakhshan province in north-eastern Afghanistan, where the Sar-e-Sang mine deposits have been worked for more than 6,000 years. Afghanistan was the source of lapis for the ancient Egyptian and Mesopotamian civilizations, as well as the later Greeks and Romans. Ancient Egyptians obtained the material through trade with Mesopotamians, as part of Egypt–Mesopotamia relations. During the height of the Indus Valley civilisation, approximately 2000 BC, the Harappan colony, now known as Shortugai, was established near the lapis mines.

In addition to the Afghan deposits, lapis is also extracted in the Andes (near Ovalle, Chile); and to the west of Lake Baikal in Siberia, Russia, at the Tultui lazurite deposit.  It is mined in smaller amounts in Angola, Argentina, Burma, Pakistan, Canada, Italy, India, and in the United States in California and Colorado.

Uses and substitutes
Lapis takes an excellent polish and can be made into jewellery, carvings, boxes, mosaics, ornaments, small statues, and vases. Interior items and finishing buildings can be also made with lapis. Two of the columns framing the  iconostasis in Saint Isaac's Cathedral in Saint Petersburg are built with lapis. During the Renaissance, lapis was ground and processed to make the pigment ultramarine for use in frescoes and oil painting. Its usage as a pigment in oil paint largely ended during the early 19th century, when a chemically identical synthetic variety became available.

Lapis lazuli is commercially synthesized or simulated by the Gilson process, which is used to make artificial ultramarine and hydrous zinc phosphates. It may also be substituted by spinel or sodalite, or by dyed jasper or howlite.

History and art

In the ancient world

Lapis lazuli has been mined in Afghanistan and exported to the Mediterranean world and South Asia since the Neolithic age, along the ancient trade route between Afghanistan and the Indus Valley, dating to the 7th millennium BC. Quantities of these beads have also been found at 4th millennium BC settlements in Northern Mesopotamia, and at the Bronze Age site of Shahr-e Sukhteh in southeast Iran (3rd millennium BC). A dagger with a lapis handle, a bowl inlaid with lapis, amulets, beads, and inlays representing eyebrows and beards, were found in the Royal Tombs of the Sumerian city-state of Ur from the 3rd millennium BC. 

Lapis was also used in ancient Mesopotamia by the Akkadians, Assyrians, and Babylonians for seals and jewelry. It is mentioned several times in the Mesopotamian poem, the Epic of Gilgamesh (17th–18th century BC), one of the oldest known works of literature. The Statue of Ebih-Il, a 3rd millennium BC statue found in the ancient city-state of Mari in modern-day Syria, now in the Louvre, uses lapis lazuli inlays for the irises of the eyes.

In ancient Egypt, lapis lazuli was a favorite stone for amulets and ornaments such as scarabs. Lapis jewellery has been found at excavations of the Predynastic Egyptian site Naqada (3300–3100 BC). At Karnak, the relief carvings of Thutmose III (1479-1429 BC) show fragments and barrel-shaped pieces of lapis lazuli being delivered to him as tribute. Powdered lapis was used as eyeshadow by Cleopatra.

Jewelry made of lapis lazuli has also been found at Mycenae attesting to relations between the Myceneans and the developed civilizations of Egypt and the East.

Pliny the Elder wrote that lapis lazuli is “opaque and sprinkled with specks of gold”.  Because the stone combines the blue of the heavens and golden glitter of the sun, it was emblematic of success in the old Jewish tradition. In the early Christian tradition lapis lazuli was regarded as the stone of Virgin Mary.

In late classical times and as late as the Middle Ages, lapis lazuli was often called sapphire (sapphirus in Latin, sappir in Hebrew), though it had little to do with the stone today known as the blue corundum variety sapphire.  In his book on stones, the Greek scientist Theophrastus described "the sapphirus, which is speckled with gold," a description which matches lapis lazuli.

There are many references to "sapphire" in the Old Testament, but most scholars agree that, since sapphire was not known before the Roman Empire, they most likely are references to lapis lazuli. For instance, Exodus 24:10: "And they saw the God of Israel, and there was under his feet as it were a paved work of a sapphire stone..." (KJV). The words used in the Latin Vulgate Bible in this citation are "quasi opus lapidis sapphirini", the terms for lapis lazuli. Modern translations of the Bible, such as the New Living Translation Second Edition, refer to lapis lazuli in most instances instead of sapphire.

Vermeer 
Johannes Vermeer used lapis lazuli paint, in the Girl with a Pearl Earring painting.

Gallery

See also

References

Bibliography
 Bakhtiar, Lailee McNair, Afghanistan's Blue Treasure Lapis Lazuli, Front Porch Publishing, 2011, 
 Bariand, Pierre, "Lapis Lazuli", Mineral Digest, Vol 4 Winter 1972.
 
 Herrmann, Georgina, "Lapis Lazuli: The Early Phases of Its Trade", Oxford University Dissertation, 1966.
 Korzhinskij, D. S., "Gisements bimetasomatiques de philogophite et de lazurite de l'Archen du pribajkale", Traduction par Mr. Jean Sagarzky-B.R.G.M., 1944.
 Lapparent A. F., Bariand, P. et Blaise, J.,  "Une visite au gisement de lapis lazuli de Sar-e-Sang du Hindu Kouch, Afghanistan," C.R. Somm.S.G.P.p. 30, 1964.
 .
 Wise, Richard W., Secrets of the Gem Trade: The Connoisseur's Guide to Precious Gemstones, 2016 
 Wyart J. Bariand P, Filippi J., "Le Lapis Lazuli de Sar-e-SAng", Revue de Geographie Physique et de Geologie Dynamique (2) Vol. XIV Pasc. 4 pp. 443–448, Paris, 1972.

External links

 Lapis lazuli at Gemstone.org
 Documentation from online course produced by University of California at Berkeley
 Lapislazuli: Occurrence, Mining and Market Potential of a blue Mineral Pigment
 
 "Why a Medieval Woman Had Lapis Lazuli Hidden in Her Teeth", The Atlantic, January 2019
 Lapis Lazuli birthstone virtues and story at birthstone.guide

Gemstones
Metamorphic rocks